Savage Islands (also known as Nate and Hayes in the United States) is a 1983 swashbuckling adventure film set in the South Pacific in the late 19th century. Directed by Ferdinand Fairfax and filmed on location in Fiji and New Zealand, it starred Tommy Lee Jones, Michael O'Keefe and Jenny Seagrove.

It was one of several 1980s films designed to capitalize on the popularity of Indiana Jones, but Savage Islands was a flop at the box office.

Plot
The film tells the story of missionary Nathaniel "Nate" Williamson, taken to an island mission with his fiancée Sophie. Their ship, the Rona, is captained by the roguish William "Bully" Hayes, who also takes a liking to Sophie. When Sophie is kidnapped by slave trader Ben Pease, "Nate" teams with Hayes in order to find her.  The two men enjoy a friendly rivalry for Sophie's affections, and she is to some extent torn between them, though committed to Nate.

Cast
 Tommy Lee Jones as Bully Hayes
 Michael O'Keefe as Nathaniel Williamson
 Max Phipps as Ben Pease
 Jenny Seagrove as Sophie
 Bruce Allpress as Mr. Blake
 Grant Tilly as Count von Rittenberg
 Peter Rowley as Louis Beck
 Prince Tui Teka as King of Ponape

Production
The story was based on the adventures of real-life blackbirders Bully Hayes and Ben Pease. The character of Hayes was much softened in the film and Pease turned into a villain. The script was rewritten by John Hughes.

The director was Ferdinand Fairfax, an Englishman most recently notable for his direction of the television series, Churchill — The Wilderness Years. Fairfax described the film as a tongue-in-cheek adventure in the style of Butch Cassidy and the Sundance Kid. "I'm not making Carry on Pirates or anything like that, but I think it will be a very funny film", he said.

The film was entirely financed with New Zealand money but achieved distribution in the US. Producer Phillips raised money in part on the back of the success of his short film, Dollar Bottom.

The film was shot in Fiji, Rotorua and Urupukapuka Island. At Urupukapuka, the producers built a set reconstructing the Port of Samoa.

Release and reception
The film has a cult following which seems to have encouraged the release of the film on Region 1 and Region 2 DVD, in June and November 2006 respectively.

Reception
In his review, Roger Ebert gave the film one star and called it 'inexplicable', criticizing the tone and plot. The New York Times gave plaudits to the performances, but felt the film was 'no fun at all', criticizing the inconsistent action and production values.

Colin Greenland reviewed Savage Islands for Imagine magazine, and stated that "Savage Islands doesn't have quite the pace or panache of Raiders of the Lost Ark, but it is first-class nonsense."

Legacy
Sir Richard Taylor of Weta Workshop said Savage Islands kick-started the New Zealand filmmaking boom of the 1980s.

Savage Islands inspired Lawrence Watt-Evans to write the 1992 novella The Final Folly of Captain Dancy.

References

External links

Savage Islands at New Zealand On Screen

Review at DVD Savant

1983 films
1980s New Zealand films
1983 drama films
1980s adventure films
Action films based on actual events
Films scored by Trevor Jones
Films set in the 1860s
Films set in the 1870s
Films shot in Fiji
Films with screenplays by John Hughes (filmmaker)
New Zealand adventure films
Paramount Pictures films
Pirate films
Seafaring films
Films directed by Ferdinand Fairfax
Films with screenplays by David Odell